Aleksandr Avdeyev (sometimes shown as Aleksandrs Avdejevs; born 1 August 1956) is a Soviet former sprint canoer who competed in the late 1970s and early 1980s. He has won six medals at the ICF Canoe Sprint World Championships, with four golds (K-4 10000 m: 1977, 1978, 1979, 1983), a silver (K-4 1000 m: 1977), and a bronze (K-4 1000 m: 1979).

Avdeyev also finished seventh in the K-4 1000 m event at the 1980 Summer Olympics in Moscow.

References

1956 births
Soviet male canoeists
Canoeists at the 1980 Summer Olympics
Olympic canoeists of the Soviet Union
ICF Canoe Sprint World Championships medalists in kayak
Living people